Andreas Maria Karl von Aulock (23 March 1893  – 23 June 1968) was a highly decorated Oberst in the Wehrmacht during World War II who commanded the 79th Infantry Division.  He was a recipient of the  Knight's Cross of the Iron Cross with Oak Leaves. The Knight's Cross of the Iron Cross and its higher grade Oak Leaves was awarded to recognise extreme battlefield bravery or successful military leadership.

Von Aulock was promoted to Oberst (Colonel) and received the Knight's Cross of the Iron Cross for operations in the Kuban bridgehead as commander of a combat group of the 79th Infantry Division in November 1943. He was captured on 17 August 1944 by forces of the American 83rd Division after surrendering the German garrison during the Battle of Saint-Malo.

Awards and decorations
 Iron Cross (1914)
 2nd Class (9 November 1914)
 1st Class (23 February 1915)
 Honour Cross of the World War 1914/1918
 Clasp to the Iron Cross (1939)
 2nd Class (27 November 1939)
 1st Class  (21 June 1940)
 Eastern Front Medal
 Kuban Shield
 German Cross in Gold on 27 October 1941 as Oberstleutnant in Infanterie-Regiment 226
 Knight's Cross of the Iron Cross with Oak Leaves
 Knight's Cross on 6 November 1943 as Oberst and commander of Grenadier-Regiment 226
 551st Oak Leaves on 16 August 1944 as Oberst and Festungskommandant (Fortress commander) of St. Malo

References

Citations

Bibliography

 
 
 
 
 

1893 births
1968 deaths
People from Kluczbork County
German Army personnel of World War I
Recipients of the clasp to the Iron Cross, 1st class
Recipients of the Gold German Cross
Recipients of the Knight's Cross of the Iron Cross with Oak Leaves
German prisoners of war in World War II held by the United States
People from the Province of Silesia
20th-century Freikorps personnel